Kerman (also romanized as Kermun and Karmana), known in ancient times as the satrapy of Carmania, is the capital city of Kerman Province, Iran. At the 2011 census, its population was 821,394, in 221,389 households, making it the 10th most populous city of Iran.

It is the largest and most developed city in Kerman Province and one of the most important cities in the southeast of Iran. It is also one of the largest cities of Iran in terms of area. Kerman is famous for its long history and strong cultural heritage. The city is home to many historic mosques and Zoroastrian fire temples. Kerman became the capital city of Iranian dynasties several times during its history. It is located on a large, flat plain, 800 km (500 mi) south-east of Tehran, the capital of Iran.

History 

Kerman was founded as a defensive outpost, with the name Veh-Ardashir, by Ardashir I, founder of the Sasanian Empire, in the 3rd century AD. After the Battle of Nahāvand in 642, the city came under Muslim rule. At first the city's relative isolation allowed Kharijites and Zoroastrians to thrive there, but the Kharijites were wiped out in 698, and the population was mostly Muslim by 725. Already in the eighth century the city was famous for its manufacture of cashmere wool shawls and other textiles. The Abbasid Caliphate's authority over the region was weak, and power passed in the tenth century to the Buyid dynasty. The region and city fell to Mahmud of Ghazni in the late tenth century. The name Kerman was adopted at some point in the tenth century.

Under the rule of the Seljuk Turks in the 11th and 12th centuries, Kerman remained virtually independent, conquering Oman and Fars. When Marco Polo visited Kerman in 1271, it had become a major trade emporium linking the Persian Gulf with Khorasan and Central Asia. Subsequently, however, the city was sacked many times by various invaders. Kerman expanded rapidly during the Safavid dynasty. Carpets and rugs were exported to England and Germany during this period.

In 1793 Lotf Ali Khan defeated the Qajars, and in 1794 he captured Kerman. But soon after he was besieged in Kerman for six months by Agha Mohammad Khan Qajar. When the city fell to Agha Mohammad Khan, angered by the popular support that Lotf Ali Khan had received,many of the male inhabitants were killed or blinded, and a pile was made out of 20,000 detached eyeballs and poured in front of the victorious Agha Mohammad Khan. Many women and children were sold into slavery, and in ninety days the city turned into ruins. However, the Zoroastrians of Kerman who had been strong supporters of Lotf Ali Khan suffered the wrath of the founder of Qajar dynasty the most during this period.

The present city of Kerman was rebuilt in the 19th century to the northwest of the old city, but the city did not return to its former size until the 20th century.

Geography 
Kerman is located on a high margin of Kavir-e Lut (Lut Desert) in the south-central part of Iran. The city is surrounded by mountains. Kerman is also located along the Saheb Al Zaman mountain. The city is 1,755 m (5,758 ft) above sea level, making it third in elevation among provincial capitals in Iran. Winter brings very cold nights to Kerman. Mountains in the south and southeast Jftan Joopar and Plvar and Kerman have snow all year round. Kerman is located at latitude 30.29 and longitude 57.06.

Climate 
Kerman has a cold desert climate (BWk, according to the Köppen climate classification), with hot summers and cool to cold winters. Precipitation is scarce throughout the year.

The city's many districts are surrounded by mountains that bring variety to Kerman's year-round weather pattern. The northern part of the city is located in an arid desert area, while the highland of the southern part of the city enjoys a more moderate climate.

The city of Kerman has a moderate climate. The average annual rainfall is 148 mm. Otherwise, its climate is relatively cool (by Iranian standards).

Geological characteristics 
For Iranian paleontologists, Kerman has always been considered a fossil paradise. The discovery of new dinosaur footprints in 2005 renewed hopes for better understanding the history of this area.

Economy 

The economy of Kerman is mostly based on farming, notably nut farming and also mining. Sarchashmeh Copper mine is the second biggest copper mine in the world after the one located in Chile. Pistachios are an important part of the economy in Kerman, with Kerman Province being the largest producer of pistachios in Iran and the world.

Carpet weaving is one of the main industries of the city, and the carpets produced there are renowned internationally. Carpet weaving is a very old tradition in Kerman. The oldest carpet discovered in Kerman, dates from about 500 years ago. Cotton textiles and goats-wool shawls are also manufactured.

A number of modern establishments such as textile mills and brickworks also have been constructed. The province's mineral wealth includes copper and coal.

Culture 

Kerman is among several cities in Iran with a strong cultural heritage, which is expressed in the local accent, poetry, local music, handicrafts and customs that Kerman has introduced to the world.

The only anthropology Iran museum of Zoroastrians in the world, which showcases the ancient history of Zoroastrians, is in Kerman's Fire Temple. The idea of launching the museum along with the library of Kerman's Zoroastrian Society came to light in 1983, when the head of the society, Parviz Vakhashouri, and the former head of the library, Mehran Gheibi, collected cultural heritage artifacts of Kerman's Zoroastrian community. These two officials added many other objects to this collection. The museum was officially inaugurated during Jashn-e Tirgan in 2005 by Iran's Cultural Heritage, Handicrafts and Tourism Organization (ICHHTO).

Jashn-e Tirgan or Tiregan is an ancient Iranian rain festival observed on July 1. The festivity refers to archangel Tir (literally meaning arrow) or Tishtar (lightning), who appear in the sky to generate thunder and lightning for providing much needed rain.

The Sadeh ceremony is celebrated every year in Kerman.

Also, the archeological ancient areas of Jiroft and Tappe Yahya Baft are located south of Kerman. Rayen Castle is also located in Rayen town, southeast of Kerman.

Some of the handicrafts and souvenirs of the province of Kerman are traditional embroidery known as pateh, carpets, rugs, jajeems, Kilims (a coarse carpet), satchels, and other hand woven articles. Caraway seeds and pistachio of Rafsanjan and Kerman are best of the main items of this province.

Demography 
The people of Kerman are Persians, and most are Shia Muslim. Kerman is a religious conservative city. Kerman has a small Zoroastrian minority.

The population of the city in 1996 was 385,000 and in 2006 was 515,414; the current population is 621,374, including 312,873 male and 308,501 female.

Population development 
Some of these figures are estimates only, official census results are indicated with (¹).

¹ official census results

Government 
Politics in Kerman are influenced by the former President Ali Akbar Hashemi Rafsanjani, his brother and Vice President Mohammad Hashemi Rafsanjani and Hossein Marashi, both from nearby Rafsanjan. Mohammad Javad Bahonar was born in Kerman. He was an Iranian scholar, Shiite theologian and politician who served as the Prime minister of Iran from 15to 30August 1981 when he was assassinated by Mujahedin-e-Khalq (MEK).

Colleges and universities 
 Kerman Azad University 
 Shahid Bahonar University of Kerman is one of technological institutions of Kerman province
 Kerman University of Medical Sciences is the a medical university in Iran.
 Kerman Graduate University of Technology is a graduate-level degree-granting institution.
 Shahid Chamran Technical College of Kerman
 Payam Noor University of Kerman
 Kerman Khaje-Nasir Higher Education Center

Sport 
The city is home to many athletic teams representing different sports. Mes Kerman is the major football team of the city. It was promoted to Iran's top league, the Persian Gulf Pro League, in the 2005–06 season. The team is named after and sponsored by Kerman's copper industries. This team has a history of participating in the AFC Champions League. The team now competes in the Azadegan League. Also, many famous soccer players were born in Kerman.

MES handball team is in the top league.
MES cycling team is in the top league of cycling in the country.
MES chess team is in the first league of the country.
The city's baseball team, known as the Boshra Baseball Academy, won the country's baseball cup for the first time in 2013.

In October 2013, Kerman was host to the qualifying Group D of AFC U-19 Championship 2014.

Kerman sport venues

15,000-seat Shahid Bahonar Stadium
30,000-seat dedicated MES soccer team stadium (under construction)
Salimi Kia Stadium
Sports Complex of Imam Ali
Sirch Ski Resort
Kerman Horseback Riding Club
International Kart racing track: This track is one of the most standard Kart racing tracks in Iran.
international Large track cycling (under construction)

Media
Kerman is the media hub of the Kerman Province. Several newspapers are published in the city, such as Kerman Emruz (Kerman Today) and Bidari. Hadis–Pasargad is a weekly newspaper. Kerman has a 24-hour TV channel known as the Kerman Channel or Channel 5. The city also has a radio station.

Transportation 

Kerman is on the Tehran, Bandar Abbas and Zahedan route. Ayatollah Hashemi Rafsanjani Airport is considered one of Iran's main airports. It has daily and weekly flights to Tehran, Ahwaz, Yazd, Esfahan, Bandar Abbas, Mashhad and Shiraz. Also, the Trans-Iranian Railway passes through this city. Kerman's newly built bus terminus, Adineh, opened in May 2013.

Metro and Tram
Kerman's Metro had been approved by the government cabinet and was meant to cover large parts of the metropolitan area in Kerman, but the project's operations were cancelled due to several issues. Later it was heard that a tram project would replace the Metro project, but this project has not been launched yet.
In 2017, it was announced that Metro and Tramway would both be used in Kerman with two lines in each system.

Chabahar–Zahedan Railway 
In May 2016, during Indian Prime Minister Narendra Modi's trip to Iran, agreement was signed to develop two berths at Port of Chabahar and to build new Chabahar–Zahedan railway, as part of North–South Transport Corridor, by Indian Railways' public sector unit Ircon International.

The establishment of the port of Chabahar's connection to the country's railway plan, is under study and consideration. With the completion of the Kerman–Zahedan railway and its connection to the port of Chabahar, this port will connect to the Trans-Iranian Railway.

Health
The city has several hospitals. The well known ones are: Afzalipour hospital, Doctor Bahonar Hospital, Raziye Firoz Hospital, and Mehregan Hospital.

Notable people

 Al-Mahani (9th century mathematician and astronomer)
 Khwaju Kermani (14th century poet from the 14th century)
 Shah Nimatullah Wali (14th century Sufi Master and poet)
 Ganj Ali Khan (16th century Kurdish governor of Kerman.
 Mirza Reza Kermani (Iranian revolutionary who assassinated the Shah of Persia)
 Qasem Soleimani (Commander of the Qods Force, a division of the Iranian Islamic Revolutionary Guard Corps)
 Mohammad Javad Bahonar (the Prime minister of Iran from 15 to 30 August 1981 when he was assassinated by Mujahideen-e Khalq)
 Mohammad-Reza Bahonar (the conservative First Deputy Speaker of the Parliament of Iran)
 Mohammad Mehdi Zahedi (the former Iranian minister of Science and Technology and Mathematics full professor)
 Majid Namjoo (Iranian politician who was the Minister of Energy in the 9th government)
 Mohammad Ebrahim Bastani Parizi
 Houshang Moradi Kermani (writer)
 Keikhosrow Shahrokh
 Peyman Soltani, conductor of Melal Orchestra
 Saeed Nafisi (writer)
 Arash Borhani (soccer player)
 Zahra Nemati (paralympic archery gold medalist at the 2012 Summer Paralympics2016 Summer Paralympics2020 Summer Paralympics)
 Roohollah Khaleghi
 Ali Movahedi-Kermani
 Mahnaz Afkhami (women's rights activist )
 Ahmad Madani (Iranian politician, Commander of Iranian Navy (1979))
 Javad Nurbakhsh, previous Master of the Nimatullahi Sufi Order)
 Ahmadreza Ahmadi
 Mozzafar Baghai
 Ali Akbar Abdolrashidi
 Parviz Shahriari (mathematician, author, translator and political activist)
 Tahereh Saffarzadeh, poet and writer

Gallery

Surrounding municipalities

See also

 Arg e Bam
 Ganjali Khan Complex
 Jabalieh
 Kerman carpet
 List of Safavid governors of Kerman
 Pateh
 Shazdeh Garden
 Shahid Bahonar University of Kerman

References

Bibliography

External links
 

 Google Map: Kerman
 Kerman's Weather
 Kerman's city map
 Mahan Air
 Kerman's portal
 Kerman's tourist portal
 Kerman Disaster Management Center 
 Kerman's job agency
 Kerman Zoroastrian Association
 Kerman Travel Video 

 
Tourist attractions in Iran
Populated places in Kerman County
Cities in Kerman Province